Enemy of the Daleks is a Big Finish Productions audio drama based on the long-running British science fiction television series Doctor Who.

Plot
On the planet Bliss, the Daleks meet their deadliest enemy.

Cast
Seventh Doctor – Sylvester McCoy
Ace – Sophie Aldred
Hex – Philip Olivier
Lieutenant Beth Stokes – Kate Ashfield
Sergeant Tahira Khan – Bindya Solanki
Professor Toshio Shimura – Eiji Kusuhara
Sistermatic/Kiseibya/Male Patient/Male Voice – Jez Fielder
Daleks – Nicholas Briggs

The Three Companions
The Three Companions bonus feature, Part 2.
In Memoriam by Marc Platt

Polly – Anneke Wills
The Brigadier – Nicholas Courtney
Announcer – Russell Floyd

Continuity
 Although this is Hex's first encounter with Daleks, Ace has met them in the TV story Remembrance of the Daleks and the audio story The Genocide Machine.
 During this confrontation, the Doctor references the Daleks' origins- without expressly naming Davros-, and admits that he failed when he was once given a mission to avert the Daleks' creation (Genesis of the Daleks)

External links
Big Finish Productions – Enemy of the Daleks

2009 audio plays
Seventh Doctor audio plays
Dalek audio plays
Plays by David Bishop